Ixora raivavaensis is a species of flowering plant in the family Rubiaceae. It is endemic to Raivavae in French Polynesia, hence its name.

References

External links
World Checklist of Rubiaceae

raiavaensis
Flora of French Polynesia
Near threatened plants
Taxonomy articles created by Polbot